Singapore India Maritime Bilateral Exercise (SIMBEX) is an annual bilateral naval exercise conducted by the Indian Navy and the Republic of Singapore Navy (RSN).

History 
The exercise has been held annually since 1994. 

Over the years, SIMBEX has progressed beyond its original emphasis on anti-submarine warfare to include elements of maritime security, anti-air, and anti-surface warfare. Harbour phases include various planning conferences and simulator-based warfare training/ wargaming. In a statement, the Indian High Commission in Singapore in 2019 stated that "SIMBEX is the longest uninterrupted naval exercise that India has with any other country".

Simbex-2019 took place on the South China Sea and included maritime combat exercises such as firing exercises,  tracking exercises, and coordinated tactical exercises. The 28th edition of SIMBEX took place from September 02 to 04, 2021 in the southern fringes of the South China Sea.

References

External links

Indian naval exercises
Military exercises and wargames
Military education and training in India
India–Singapore military relations